Daughter of Darkness may refer to:
 Daughter of Darkness (1948 film), a 1948 British film
 Daughters of Darkness, a 1971 Belgian horror film
 Daughter of Darkness (1990 film), a 1990 film made for television
 Daughter of Darkness (1993 film), a 1993 Hong Kong horror film
 "Daughter of Darkness" (song), a 1970 song by Tom Jones
 Daughter of Darkness (novel), a 1973 thriller by a husband and wife writing as J.R. Lowell